William Alexander Pringle (24 February 1932 – October 2006) was an English professional footballer who played as an inside forward.

References

1932 births
2006 deaths
Footballers from Liverpool
English footballers
Association football inside forwards
Leeds United F.C. players
Grimsby Town F.C. players
Rhyl F.C. players
English Football League players